The Sermon were a rock band from Syracuse, New York that lasted from the late 1960s to early 1970s. They are known for their 1969 hit "Never Gonna Find Another Love" which was released on the Kama Sutra record label. They re-united decades later.

Background
Formed in mid-1968 and managed by George Plavocos who was a disc jockey with WNDR-AM 1260 disc jockey, they started out as The Sermon and were signed to Transcontinent Records in Buffalo. However an issue involving another New York group with the same name, they had to change their name to The Sir Men. Later they signed to Thunderbird Records they signed as The Sir Men. Later on they would change back to The Sermon. They were made up of experienced musicians who had played and recorded in other bands. Kal Dee was the lead singer of a Cortland band, Kal Dee & the Showmen who recorded a single, "Mind Your Mama" bw "I'm Still in Love With You", released on Lawn Records in 1963. He had also played keyboards with Don Barber & The Dukes on their recordings, "The Waddle" bw "What Your Name" which was released on Thunderbird in 1965.

Dave Novak, Bill Weiss  and Bill Wolfe had been in The Nightcaps who had released the single "Keep on Runnin" bw "Knock On Wood" in 1967.

History
The group played at clubs in Rochester and Buffalo. They also did college parties around the area. They also played venues such as the Campus Inn, Red Dog Saloon and the Holiday Bowl. 
In 1969 the band had their single "You're Never Gonna Find Another Love" bw What A Day This Could Be" released on Thunderbird 520. The A side was written by Mickey Nicotra and the B side by Carl Falso and Mike Anthony. Both sides were produced by Bruce Dedrick. In addition to production, the background vocals were provided by members of the Dedrick family. On August 16, the record was listed as a pick for the Hot 100 by Billboard in its "Other Picks" section. The Thunderbird single was referred to as a listenable ditty with teen appeal and got a four star rating by Record World in its September 27 issue.

Signed to Kama Sutra
In its November 22 article, Record World stated that Buddah Records had reactivated its Kama Sutra label and along with The Jaggerz, The Sermon (referred to as The Sir Men) had been signed to Kama Sutra. The master of their single had been acquired from Thunderbird by promotion director Marty Thau and the single was to appear on Kama Sutra. This came about as a result of the group being discovered by Buddah's mid-West operations manager, Jack Hakim. By 1970, and now credited to The Sermon, the single was released on Kama Sutra KA 501. Due to lack of promotion of them by their label who were concentrating on other artists which included Morris Levy promoting "The Rapper" by The Jaggerz instead of their single, the group broke up in January, 1970. A review of the single in the January 31 issue of Cashbox said that the single had a sound that demands a second listen and could crop up in the Top 40 with little difficulty. By April, 1970, the record was at #7, just ahead of Aretha Franklin's "Call Me" in the Record World "ONE STOP Top Ten" chart. For two weeks in September, it was #1 on the WOLF-AM weekly vinyl survey. It also hung around in the local chart for nine weeks along with the national hits.

Following the break up in January, 1970
In  April,  Kal Dee having left the group and was appearing with his group, The Kal Dee Trio at venues. In May, they were playing at the Syracuse Motor Inn's Cavalier Room.

Later years
Some years after their break up, a compilation album, History of Syracuse Music Volume 3 & 4 was released. It included a demo the group had recorded for their follow up single. The song was a Carl Falso composition, "It Almost Made Me Cry".
   
In 2016, Dave Novak released his first CD album which included covers of classics and his own compositions.

Reunion
In June, 2016, original members Jimmy Cox, Dave Novak, Bill Weiss, Bob Stasko and Bob Papaleoni reunited to perform at Pensebene's Casa Grande on State Fair Blvd. Jimmy Johns was on drums as original drummer Billy Wolfe had since passed away.

Members
 Kal Dee ... vocals, trumpet, piano
 Jimmy Cox ... Hammond B-3 organ
 Dave Novak ... guitar, vocals
 Bob Stasko ... sax, flute, maracas, vocals
 Bob Papaleoni ... drums 
 Bill Weiss ... bass
 Bill Wolfe ... drums, vocals

Additional
 Frankie Grasso ... trumpet
 Steve Cohen ... trombone
 Pete Hamilton ... sax,

Discography

References

External links
 Syracuse New Times, June 8, 2016: A Rockin’ Sunday Sermon
 HISTORY OF SYRACUSE MUSIC: CHAPTER 26 - THE SERMON
 "You're Never Gonna Find Another Love" (Original) - The Sir Men (Sermon) 
 Dinosaur Radio: The Sermon "You'll Never Find Another Love" in later years
 Original lineup of the Sermon, Syracuse's first horn band

American pop music groups
Rock music groups from New York (state)
Kama Sutra Records artists
Thunderbird Records artists
Musical groups from Syracuse, New York
Musical groups established in 1968
Musical groups disestablished in 1970